Jim Filice (born November 18, 1962) is an American former professional motorcycle racer, inducted in the Motorcycle Hall of Fame in 2000.

Career statistics

Grand Prix motorcycle racing

By season

Races by year

(key) (Races in bold indicate pole position, races in italics indicate fastest lap)

References

External links
 Profile on MotoGP.com

1962 births
Living people
Sportspeople from San Jose, California
American motorcycle racers
250cc World Championship riders
500cc World Championship riders
AMA Grand National Championship riders